William Procter (7 December 1801 – 4 April 1884) was an English-born American industrialist and candlemaker who was the co-founder of Procter & Gamble Company in 1837, along with James Gamble.

Early life
A native of England, William Procter was born in Herefordshire and educated at Lucton School. He entered into business in 1818 and was connected with the clothing industry in London in the late 1820s. In 1827, he became acquainted with William Hooper, who urged Procter to emigrate to America. He arrived in the United States in 1830 and began to manufacture candles in New York City. He moved west with his first wife, Martha Peat Procter. She died during their westward journey in Cincinnati, Ohio, in 1832.

Procter & Gamble
Planning only on staying for a short while before resuming his relocation plans, he decided to stay and spent the remainder of his life in Cincinnati. He started his business and married Olivia Norris in 1833. At his father-in-law Alexander Norris's suggestion, he joined forces in 1837 with his brother-in-law, James Gamble, to establish the company that bears their names. The company began to manufacture Ivory soap and profits grew to enormous proportions.

His son William Alexander Procter and grandson William Cooper Procter were company presidents.

Procter is buried in Spring Grove Cemetery, as is his business partner, James Gamble.

References 

American manufacturing businesspeople
British businesspeople
Burials at Spring Grove Cemetery
Businesspeople from Cincinnati
1801 births
1884 deaths
British emigrants to the United States
Procter & Gamble people
American company founders
19th-century American businesspeople
19th-century British businesspeople
Candlemakers